Gu Sung-yun (born 27 June 1994) is a South Korean professional footballer who plays as a goalkeeper for  club Hokkaido Consadole Sapporo. He has also played for the South Korea national football team.

Club career
On 29 May 2020, Gu signed for K League 1 club Daegu. In an interview he expressed that he was happy signing for Daegu.

On 25 September 2022, it was announced that Gu would return to Hokkaido Consadole Sapporo for the 2023 J1 League season.

International career
Gu was part of the senior South Korea squad for the 2015 EAFF East Asian Cup.

Club statistics
Updated to 25 February 2023.

International clean sheets

Results list South Korea's goal tally first.

Honours

Club
Hokkaido Consadole Sapporo
J.League Division 2: 2016

International
South Korea U-23
King's Cup: 2015

South Korea
EAFF E-1 Football Championship: 2019

References

External links

 Hokkaido Consadole Sapporo Official Site Profile 

1994 births
Living people
Footballers from Seoul
South Korean footballers
South Korean expatriate footballers
South Korea under-23 international footballers
South Korea international footballers
Association football goalkeepers
J1 League players
J2 League players
Cerezo Osaka players
Daegu FC players
Gimcheon Sangmu FC players
Hokkaido Consadole Sapporo players
Footballers at the 2016 Summer Olympics
Olympic footballers of South Korea